Scoliacma albicostata is a moth in the family Erebidae. It was described by George Hampson in 1918. It is found in Papua New Guinea.

Taxonomy
The status of this species is uncertain. It is probably a female of Lambula flavobrunnea.

References

Moths described in 1918
Lithosiina